Dobieszewo may refer to the following places:
Dobieszewo, Kuyavian-Pomeranian Voivodeship (north-central Poland)
Dobieszewo, Pomeranian Voivodeship (north Poland)
Dobieszewo, West Pomeranian Voivodeship (north-west Poland)